Presence of Mind is a 1999 Spanish-American drama film directed by Antoni Aloy and starring Sadie Frost, Lauren Bacall, Harvey Keitel, and Jude Law. The film is based on the 1898 novella The Turn of the Screw  by Henry James.

Synopsis 
A woman is hired to watch over two recently orphaned children, Flora and her brother Miles (played by Nilo Mur). The woman starts seeing ghosts and the children begin some very peculiar and disturbing behavior.

Cast 
 Sadie Frost as Governess
 Lauren Bacall as Mado Remei
 Ella Jones as Flora
 Nilo Zimmerman as Miles 
 Harvey Keitel as The Master
 Agustí Villaronga as Fosc 
 Dayna Danika as Miss Jessel
 Jude Law as Secretary
 Jack Taylor as Father
 Luz Fortuny as Aunt

Production 
Frost has described the filming as intense due to the needs of the role of the Governess and having to be in every scene. Filming took place at the Raixa Estate in Mallorca, Spain on a budget of $3 to 5 million and took 29 days to complete. It marked Aloy's feature film directing debut. Aloy has stated that he wanted the film to focus on "the sentimental bonds that are established between the governess and the child".

Release 
Presence of Mind released in September 1999. It was also released in Spain as El celo. The film was screened as part of the Cinema d'Autor a l'Augusta at the University of the Balearic Islands in 2009.

Reception 
Critical reception has been mixed. Variety reviewed the film, writing that "Everything that's subtle and open to interpretation in James' novel of evil, possession and ghosts is lurid and obvious here, with a star turn by Sadie Frost that's unauthoritative to say the least and arch support from Lauren Bacall that gives the drama a ripple of unintentionally camp humor." Sight & Sound was also dismissive, as they felt that "As a measure of how James' text can be milked for terrible gothic grandstanding, Presence of Mind was exemplary." The New York Times also noted that "It seems to want the distinction of being the most uncomfortable ''Screw'' adaptation."

Philip Horne was more favorable, calling it "impressively atmospheric, and successfully unsettling".

See also
List of ghost films

References

External links

1999 horror films
1999 films
1999 drama films
Spanish horror films
American horror drama films
Spanish drama films
English-language Spanish films
Films based on The Turn of the Screw
1990s English-language films
1990s American films